Saint Samson, Saint-Samson, or Saint Sampson may refer to:

People
Saint Samson of Dol, born late 5th century in Wales, active there and in Brittany
Saint Sampson the Hospitable (died c. 530), born in Rome, became a citizen of Constantinople and saint of the Eastern Churches

Places
Saint-Samson is the name or part of the name of several communes in northern France:

Saint-Samson, Calvados, in the Calvados département 
Saint-Samson, Mayenne, in the Mayenne département 
Saint-Samson-de-Bonfossé, in the Manche département
Saint-Samson-de-la-Roque, in the Eure  département 
Saint-Samson-la-Poterie, in the Oise département 
Saint-Samson-sur-Rance, in the Côtes-d'Armor département 
La Ferté-Saint-Samson, in the Seine-Maritime département

Saint Sampson is the name of several places (both these named after St Samson of Dol):
Saint Sampson, Guernsey, a parish of Guernsey
St Sampson, Cornwall, a parish in Cornwall